The Hopkins Trophy was an annual men's professional team golf competition between teams representing the United States and Canada. It was played from 1952 to 1956. The Americans won all five contests that were played. The matches were sponsored by John Jay Hopkins.

Format
The 1952 event was contested over two days with three 36-hole fourballs on the first day and six 36-hole singles on the final day. Each match involved three points, one for the morning round, one for the afternoon round and a third for the overall result.

The 1953 event was extended to three days with three fourballs on the first day and six singles on the second and third days. Matches were reduced to 18 holes with one point for the winner of each 9 holes and a further point for the winner over all 18 holes. In 1954 there were six singles on the first day, three fourballs on the second day and then two sets of six singles on the final day.

The 1955 match was held in the United States for the first time and was reduced to two days, with six singles on the first day and three fourballs on the second. Bad weather meant that only the first 9 holes of the singles matches were played on the opening day; the matches being completed on the second morning. In 1956 the fourballs were played on the first day with the singles on the final day.

From 1953 to 1956 each match involved teams of seven, with one player being rested for each session. In 1952 teams only had six players. Bill Kerr was the Captain and alternate in the Canadian team. He was originally due to play in the singles in place of Fletcher but later withdrew.

Results

Appearances
The following are those who played in at least one of the five matches.

Canada
 Al Balding 1955, 1956
 Dick Borthwick 1953
 Gordie Brydson 1952, 1954, 1955, 1956
 Pat Fletcher 1952, 1953, 1954, 1955
 Stanley Horne 1952
 Jules Huot 1952, 1953, 1954, 1955
 Jack Kay 1956
 Bill Kerr 1953, 1954, 1955, 1956
 Stan Leonard 1952, 1953, 1954, 1955, 1956
 Bobby Locke 1952, 1953, 1954
 Henry Martell 1954, 1955
 Bill Mawhinney 1956
 Peter Thomson 1953
 Murray Tucker 1956

From 1952 to 1954 the Canadian team included one or two non-Canadian guests; the South African, Bobby Locke, and the Australian, Peter Thomson.

United States
 Jerry Barber 1954, 1955
 Tommy Bolt 1953, 1956
 Julius Boros 1952, 1953
 Jack Burke Jr. 1952, 1953, 1955
 Walter Burkemo 1954
 Dave Douglas 1952, 1954
 Jack Fleck 1956
 Doug Ford 1952, 1953, 1956
 Ed Furgol 1955
 Marty Furgol 1954, 1955
 Chick Harbert 1955
 Chandler Harper 1954
 Ted Kroll 1952, 1953, 1954, 1956
 Gene Littler 1956
 Lloyd Mangrum 1955
 Cary Middlecoff 1952, 1955, 1956
 Ed Oliver 1953, 1954
 Mike Souchak 1956
 Jim Turnesa 1953

References

Team golf tournaments
Recurring sporting events established in 1952